Brandon Walton (born March 18, 1998) is an American football offensive tackle for the Tampa Bay Buccaneers of the National Football League (NFL).

Early life and education
Walton was born on March 18, 1998, in Clearwater, Florida. He attended Seminole High School, where he was named PCAC Lineman of the Year in both 2014 and 2015. He was named All-Tampa Bay and was a three-star recruit, receiving offers from more than 20 universities. He committed to Florida Atlantic University on December 5, 2015. As a freshman in 2016, he appeared in two games, against Kansas State and Old Dominion.

As a sophomore in 2017, Walton played as one of Florida Atlantic's starting offensive linemen, helping them achieve an undefeated Conference USA record. In spring 2018, he was named co-MVP of the team's offensive line. He was a preseason third-team all-conference selection and was a starting lineman, earning Phil Steele third-team All-C-USA honors at the end of the year.

As a senior, Walton earned first-team All-C-USA honors at left tackle. He was named the winner of the Spring Offensive Lineman "Top Guy" Award at the beginning of the season and was a second-team preseason all-conference selection by Athlon Sports Magazine, first-team by the Phil Steele magazine. He helped the team win the C-USA championship and started in every game. Phil Steele named him first-team all-conference at the end of the year.

Professional career
After going unselected in the 2020 NFL Draft, Walton was signed by the Buffalo Bills as an undrafted free agent. He was released on September 5, at the final roster cuts. The following day, he was signed to the team's practice squad. He was released from the practice squad on September 8.

On September 19, Walton was signed to the practice squad of the Pittsburgh Steelers. He was signed to a futures contract on January 14, 2021. He was waived by the team on August 17, during the first round of roster cuts.

On August 18, one day after being waived from Pittsburgh, Walton was claimed by the Tampa Bay Buccaneers. He was waived on August 31, at the final roster cuts, but was re-signed to the practice squad the following day. Walton was released from the practice squad on January 31, 2022. On February 16, he was signed as a free agent by Tampa Bay. Walton made the Buccaneers' final roster in 2022. He made his NFL debut in week one of the regular season, appearing on four special teams snaps in a 19–3 win over the Dallas Cowboys.

References

Further reading

1998 births
Living people
People from Clearwater, Florida
Players of American football from Florida
American football offensive linemen
Florida Atlantic Owls football players
Buffalo Bills players
Pittsburgh Steelers players
Tampa Bay Buccaneers players